Novobuzuluksky is a rural locality (a khutor) in Trostyanskoye Rural Settlement, Yelansky District, Volgograd Oblast, Russia. The population was 87 as of 2010.

Geography 
Novobuzuluksky is located on Khopyorsko-Buzulukskaya Plain, on the left bank of the Buzuluk River, 29 km southwest of Yelan (the district's administrative centre) by road. Rovinsky is the nearest rural locality.

References 

Rural localities in Yelansky District